Daniel Jobiah Bremnes (born May 11, 1983) is a Canadian Christian musician, guitarist, and drummer. He released four studio albums, Your Strength (2010), Where the Light Is (2015), Wherever I Go (2019), and Into the Wild (2022), and four extended plays. He is signed with Curb Records.

Early life
Bremnes was born as Daniel Jobiah Bremnes, on May 11, 1983, in Kamloops, British Columbia, to a pastor father, Norvil Bremnes, and to a mother, Lillis Bremnes, who owned a bed and breakfast, Amazing Acres. He has two siblings, Darcon and Darla. The Bremnes' moved to Salmon Arm, British Columbia in 1989, when his father established Living Waters Community Church, where Norvil was the pastor until January 2014. Bremnes' mother died in an automobile accident on September 14, 2006. Bremnes attended Salmon Arm Secondary School.

Music career
His music career commenced in 2010, with his album, Your Strength, that was independently released. He then released two independent singles, "Hear Your Voice" in 2012 and "After All" in 2013. During this time, Bremnes released an extended play, Light My Way, which was independently released on September 25, 2012. The extended play and singles got him Covenant Awards at the 35th Annual Awards in 2013 for Male Vocalist of the Year and Music Video of the Year for "This Life". The subsequent year, Bremnes was awarded at the 36th Annual Awards for having the Pop/Contemporary Song of the Year and Recorded Song of the Year for "Beautiful", where he got the Male Vocalist of the Year along with Artist of the Year. He signed to Sparrow Records and Capitol CMG, where he released another single, "Beautiful", in 2014, along with an extended play on April 14, 2015, Where the Light Is. The song, "Beautiful", charted at a peak of No. 17 on the Billboard magazine Christian Songs chart. This was the precursor to his first studio album, Where the Light Is, released by Sparrow Records on June 9, 2015. In 2016, his recording contract was cancelled by Capitol. Bremnes continued to work on music, eventually signing a record deal with Curb Records and releasing his third studio album, Wherever I Go in 2019. The title track was released as a single and peaked at No. 19 on the US Billboard Hot Christian Songs chart.

Discography

Studio albums

EPs

Singles

References

External links
 
 Personal Facebook account

1983 births
Living people
Canadian performers of Christian music
Musicians from British Columbia
People from Kamloops
Sparrow Records artists
Juno Award for Contemporary Christian/Gospel Album of the Year winners